The Intel Outstanding Researcher Award is presented by Intel Corporation for outstanding contributions to the development of advanced nanoelectronic and manufacturing technologies. The award was created to recognize truly outstanding contributions by researchers funded by Intel’s Corporate Research Council (previously the Semiconductor Technology Council) and associated Strategic Research Sectors (SRSs) and the inaugural awards were announced during 2012. In selecting the award winners, careful consideration is given to the fundamental insights, industrial relevance, technical difficulty, communications and potential student hiring associated with a candidate's research program.

2012 Recipients

2013 Recipients

2019 Recipients

See also

 List of engineering awards

References

External links 
 Del Alamo is awarded 2012 Intel Outstanding Researcher Award in Emerging Research Devices
 Prof. Gabriel Rebeiz Honored with 2012 Intel Outstanding Researcher Award in Microsystems
 Professor Henderson Receives Intel Outstanding Researcher Award
 Tsu Jae King Liu and Jesus del Alamo Receive Major Intel Awards
 Faculty awards and honors: 2011-2012 at Arizona State University
 Tyndall Researchers Win the Intel Outstanding Researcher Award 2012
 UCC Tyndall Researchers scoop awards

Electrical and electronic engineering awards
Intel